Big Windup! is a Japanese manga series written and illustrated by Asa Higuchi. The series follows Ren Mihashi, the previous ace pitcher in his middle school's baseball team, who suffers from low self-esteem due to a losing streak and transfers to a new high school. It's the first year that Nishiura high school has a baseball team, and they set a lofty goal of playing in the finals at legendary Hanshin Kōshien Stadium.

The manga is serialized monthly in Afternoon since its debut in 2003. As of June 2010, the chapters have been collected in 24 tankōbon volumes in Japan. The manga was on a 1-year hiatus, and resumed on the November 2011 issue of Afternoon (magazine). The series was licensed in Taiwan by Long Hung Press (長鴻出版社).

List of volumes

See also 
 List of Big Windup! characters
 List of Big Windup! episodes

References 

Big Windup